Mefenorex (Rondimen, Pondinil, Anexate) is a stimulant drug which was used as an appetite suppressant. It is an amphetamine derivative which was developed in the 1970s and used for the treatment of obesity. Mefenorex produces amphetamine as a metabolite, and has been withdrawn in many countries despite having only mild stimulant effects and relatively little abuse potential.

References 

Substituted amphetamines
Organochlorides
Norepinephrine-dopamine releasing agents
Prodrugs